Nujeh Deh (also Romanized as Nūjeh Deh) is a village in Khanamrud Rural District, in the Central District of Heris County, East Azerbaijan Province, Iran. At the 2006 census, its population was 430, in 102 families.

References 

Populated places in Heris County